Staveren can refer to the following things:

Persons:

Cornelis van Staveren (1889-1982), Olympic sailor from the Netherlands
Petra van Staveren (b. 1966), Olympic swimmer from the Netherlands

Places:

Staveren is an older name for the Dutch town of Stavoren